Session capping is a term in online advertising that means restricting (capping) the amount of specific advertising sessions a visitor to a website is allowed to have.
It greatly diminishes the amount of money the advertiser can earn.

Here, a session is defined as the total amount of time one visitor spends on a single website, regardless of how many pages he or she visits within that time. When the visitor closes his browser, or enters an entire different website, the session ends. When the visitor returns to the website, a different advertising session can be started. See also session (computer science) and 

Session capping is somewhat similar to frequency capping.

Using session capping, a specific advertising scheme can be applied to a website visit. For example, advertisements can be repeated indefinitely within a single session, or a specific order can be implemented.

References

See also
 Frequency capping

Online advertising